Heart to Heart or Heart 2 Heart may also refer to:

Film and TV
 Heart to Heart (1928 film), a 1928 silent film
 Heart to Heart (1949 film), a 1949 documentary film
 Heart 2 Heart (film), a 2010 Indonesian film
 Heart to Heart (Norwegian TV series)
 Heart to Heart (South Korean TV series)
 Heart to Heart, a novel in the High School Musical book series

Music
 Heart 2 Heart (band), an Icelandic band

Albums
 Heart to Heart (Reba McEntire album), 1981
 Heart to Heart (Elvin Jones album), 1980
 Heart to Heart (Merle Haggard and Leona Williams album), 1983
 Heart to Heart (Diane Schuur and B. B. King album), 1994
 Heart to Heart (Alan Broadbent album), 2012
 Heart 2 Heart (Kyla album), an album by Filipino singer Kyla
 Heart 2 Heart with Super Junior, a compilation album by Super Junior
 Heart to Heart (Raisa album), an album by Indonesian singer Raisa Andriana

Songs
 "Heart to Heart" (James Blunt song), 2014
 "Heart to Heart" (Kenny Loggins song), 1982
 "Heart to Heart", from the album 4Minutes Left, by 4Minute
 "Heart to Heart", from the album What About Me?, by Kenny Rogers
 "Heart to Heart", from the album Here Comes the Cowboy, by Mac DeMarco
 "Heart to Heart", from the album Aldo Nova, by Aldo Nova

Other uses
 Heart to Heart International, a humanitarian organization
 Herz zu Herz, a German patience game whose name means "Heart to Heart"

See also
 Heart (disambiguation)
 Hart to Hart, an American TV series starring Robert Wagner and Stefanie Powers
 "Heart by Heart", a song from the film The Mortal Instruments: City of Bones by Demi Lovato